Plano is a city near Aurora in Kendall County, Illinois, United States, with a population of 11,847 as of the 2020 census. It is part of the Chicago metropolitan area, being about 55 miles (90 km) from Chicago. The city was home to the Plano Harvester Company in the late 19th century, as well as the Plano Molding Company more recently. In 2011, downtown Plano was used as a set for Man of Steel.

History

In the early 1860s, the Marsh brothers began producing their Marsh Harvester in Plano. From 1863 to the beginning of the twentieth century the Plano Manufacturing Company, as it became known, provided the foundation for Plano's development. Because of this, Plano High School has adopted the reaper as its mascot.

Plano was the one-time headquarters for the Reorganized Church of Jesus Christ of Latter Day Saints.  Joseph Smith III, son of slain LDS movement founder Joseph Smith, Jr., moved to Plano in 1866 and ran the church's printing operation from there.  As the schism with the Utah branch of the Latter Day Saints deepened, he moved with the church headquarters to Lamoni, Iowa in 1880 to be closer to what the Community of Christ believed to be the true church headquarters at Temple Lot in Missouri rather than in Utah.

Community development has been centered around a strong agricultural setting, with the only inhabitants of the area before its incorporation being the owners of grist mills. This development was supported by the city's location along US Route 34 and the Illinois Zephyr Amtrak passenger rail service.

The Plano Molding Company, manufacturer of fishing tackle equipment as well as other plastic domestic containment units, has its headquarters in Plano. Both of its original factories within Plano are still in operation, but the main bulk of production is now in nearby cities Sandwich and Mendota.

Plano and Sandwich have developed a sibling-like relationship. Both deeply agricultural cities are situated along a major trading route and rail artery. The two cities' high schools have developed a rivalry that has become known to the local press as the "War on 34", due to their location along US Route 34.

In the early twenty-first century, multiple new housing developments were constructed in Plano. Due to the following economic downturn, however, many of the houses in both the new developments and older parts of town have experienced foreclosures. Nonetheless, Waubonsee Community College opened a satellite campus in Plano in late 2011.

In the summer of 2011, the City of Plano was used for exterior filming for the Superman movie, Man of Steel. Various farms around the city were also used with one being used for the Kent family farm, and the downtown area was remodeled and turned into a set for downtown Smallville. Other areas used for filming were nearby, and part of IL 56, north of Sugar Grove was shut down for two days for filming despite being closed for "Road Repair". Plano declared itself Smallville during the filming. Signs have been erected at either end of town, as well as on the end of one building on Main Street, proclaiming a similar declaration. Additionally, a "Smallville Superfest" was organized the following summer, and has since been held annually in August.

The Farnsworth House

Master Architect Ludwig Mies van der Rohe had worked on a retreat for Dr. Edith Farnsworth, a doctor from Chicago, whose complicated relationship with the architect soured the project. Cost overruns as well as questions on the house's actual usefulness led to a lawsuit between the two parties, with van der Rohe winning the suit.  In later years, the County Board decided to buy some of Farnsworth's land in order to straighten Fox River Drive (Ben Street in Plano), which would need a new bridge as well. Farnsworth pleaded her case to the County Board, citing evidence that the Board would be doing construction on an old Indian Site, but to no avail.  The road was straightened and the new bridge built; however, to this day, the old bridge piers are still visible. Around the same time, Silver Springs State Park and Wildlife Area was designated, down the road and across the river from Farnsworth's house, forever protecting the land from development.

Geography

Demographics

As of the census of 2010, there were 10,856 people, 3,549 households, and 2,656 families residing in the city. The racial makeup of the city was 74.6% White, 7.3% African American, 0.3% Native American, 1.8% Asian, 0.1% Pacific Islander, 13.0% from other races, and 3.0% from two or more races. Hispanic or Latino of any race were 31.2% of the population.

There were 3,549 households, from which 45.8% had children under the age of 18 living with them; 56.6% were married couples living together, 12.3% had a female householder with no husband present, and 25.2% were non-families; 19.6% of all households were made up of individuals, and 5.4% had someone living alone who was 65 years of age or older. The average household size was 3.06 and the average family size was 3.54.

In the city, the population was spread out, with 29.8% under the age of 18, 7.7% from 18 to 24, 38.5% from 25 to 44, 17.7% from 45 to 64, and 6.3% age 65 years or older. The median age was 29.8 years. For every 100 females, there were 98.8 males. For every 100 females age 18 and over, there were 95.9 males.

The median income for a household in the city was $58,132, and the median income for a family was $62,438. Males had a median income of $49,164 versus $37,933 for females. The per capita income for the city was $24,336. About 4.9% of families and 6.94% of the population were below the poverty line, including 7.0% of those under age 18 and 4.2% of those age 65 or over.

Culture

Media 

In 1974, Plano residents Larry and Pam Nelson founded Nelson Multimedia, Inc. Its first radio station was 107.1 WSPY-FM. WSPY-FM broadcasts an adult contemporary format, while its sister station 1480 WDYS  (which is licensed in nearby Geneva, but is broadcast out of Plano) broadcasts an adult standards format. WSPY-FM also covers local sports and news.

In addition to the AM and FM stations, Nelson Multimedia's Plano broadcast center also broadcasts a low-power television station, WSPY-TV on analog channel 30 and digital channel 35. WSPY-TV currently broadcasts local events, such as sports, city council meetings, and musical events.

Plano news is covered by local newspapers, including:

 The Plano Record
 The Kendall County Record
 Valley Life (formerly the Valley Free Press)
 The Beacon-News

Film
Plano has been the home of at least two films, the most recent being the Superman film, Man of Steel, where downtown Plano was a stand-in for Superman's hometown of Smallville, Kansas.  The other film was Witless Protection, a film starring Jennie McCarthy and Larry the Cable Guy, which used the area around Plano as the site of Larry's character's hometown, and the Plano Train Station stood in for the Town Hall and Jail.

Plano was also the filming location for the music video for "Nowadays" by Lil Skies and Landon Cube.

Education

Plano is served by Plano C.U.S.D. 88. The district consists of two elementary schools, two middle schools, and Plano High School.

Notable people 

 Arthur E. Andersen, founder of the Arthur Andersen accounting firm; born in Plano (1885)
Cole Bennett, founder of Lyrical Lemonade, grew up in Plano
 William Deering, businessman and philanthropist; moved to Plano in 1850
 Harry J. Haiselden, surgeon; born in Plano (1870)
Dennis Hastert, former U.S. Speaker of the House, lives in Plano
 Trey Kerby, basketball blogger and NBA TV host; grew up in Plano
 Lewis M. Long, U.S. congressman; attended Plano High School
 Eduardo Lucero, fashion designer; lived in Plano from age 7 to 17
Lewis Steward, Plano town founder, U.S. congressman; businessman and philanthropist; Co-founder of Marsh, Steward & Company;

See also

 Albert H. Sears House
 Farnsworth House (Plano, Illinois)
 Plano (Amtrak station)
 Plano Hotel
 Plano Stone Church

References

External links
 City of Plano, Illinois

 
Cities in Illinois
Populated places established in 1872
Cities in Kendall County, Illinois
1872 establishments in Illinois